Mike Morgan (born January 26, 1955) is an American politician from the U.S. state of Oklahoma. A  Democrat, Morgan served as the President pro tempore of the Oklahoma Senate during the 51st Oklahoma Legislature.

Early life and education
Morgan was born in Tulsa, Oklahoma on January 26, 1955. He graduated from Oklahoma State University in 1976 with a bachelor's degree. He then attended the University of Tulsa and earned a Juris Doctor in 1979.

Legal and political career
Morgan practiced law in Stillwater, Oklahoma, and was also an adjunct professor of business law at Oklahoma State University. From 1984 to 1996, he was a municipal judge for the City of Stillwater. Following his conviction, Morgan's license to practice law was suspended by the Oklahoma Supreme Court.

Morgan first entered the Oklahoma Senate in 1997, having won the election from District 21 the previous year. Morgan served as chair of the Appropriations Committee and was also a member of the Senate committees on Education; Energy and Environment; and the Judiciary.

Morgan served as Senate president pro tem in 2005 and 2006 and co-president pro tem in 2007 and 2008. The "co-president" position came about due to an unprecedented 24-24 deadlock between Democrats and Republicans in the state Senate following the 2006 elections. He could not run for re-election in 2008 due to term limits.

Morgan received the Bill Lowry Library Champion Award from the Oklahoma Library Association in 2007.

Bribery conviction
In 2011, Morgan was indicted on 63 federal charges, alongside a lobbyist and an attorney from Oklahoma City. In March 2012, following a trial, Morgan was convicted of one count of program bribery; on all the other charges, he was either acquitted, the jury deadlocked, or prosecutors dropped the charges. The conviction was in connection with Morgan's acceptance of $12,000 from an operator of assisted-living centers at a time when Morgan wrote legislation of assisted-living centers that was enacted into law. The charges against Morgan's co-defendants were either dropped or resulted in an acquittal.

The judge in the case, Robin Cauthron, was critical of the strength of the prosecution's case, saying at the sentencing hearing in 2013 that Morgan's conviction "was based on some very suspect evidence, based on the testimony of a convicted felon, resulting in a bill that no one has ever complained about." The judge originally sentenced Morgan to five years of probation, the forfeiture of $12,000 to the federal government, and 104 hours of community service.

Prosecutors challenged the sentence to the U.S. Court of Appeals for the Tenth Circuit, which upheld the conviction and overturned the sentence as unreasonably lenient, ruling that Morgan's offense "demands a significant period of incarceration." Morgan was then resentenced to 18 months in federal prison and served his sentence at the Federal Correctional Institution, Forrest City in Arkansas.

See also
Oklahoma Senate

References

External links

1955 births
Living people
Politicians from Tulsa, Oklahoma
People from Stillwater, Oklahoma
Oklahoma State University alumni
University of Tulsa alumni
Oklahoma lawyers
Democratic Party Oklahoma state senators
Politicians convicted of program bribery
Oklahoma politicians convicted of crimes
Lawyers from Tulsa, Oklahoma
21st-century American politicians